is a town in the Okhotsk subprefecture of Hokkaido, Japan. The name comes from the Ainu place name Inkar-us-i ("overlook-always doing-place"), meaning a lookout point.

On October 1, 2005, the towns of Ikutahara and Maruseppu, and the village of Shirataki, all from Monbetsu District merged into the expanded town of Engaru. As of September 2016, the town has an estimated population of 20,757.

Engaru is known as the place where Aikido originated, in the Shirataki area. It is also where the largest cosmos flower park in Japan is located. An Upper Paleolithic site at Shirataki Site Group is the source of some Yubetsu technique stone blades dating from approximately 13,000 years ago.

History
1869: Current town area was part of the Wakayama Domain (or Kishū Domain) jurisdiction. There were expanses of plains.
1896: The Church of Christ in Japan established the Hokkaido Comrades Education Association, and planned a Christian university at Engaru.
1897: On 7 May, the first immigrant party of the Hokkaido Comrades Education Association arrived in Engaru, the first party to immigrate at Engaru. But the final construction of the university's plan did not materialize.
1919: The village of Engaru is split off from Kamiyūbetsu (now the town of Yūbetsu).
1925: The village of Ikutahara split off, becoming its own town in 1934.
1934: Engaru becomes a town.
1946: The villages of Maruseppu (later becoming a town) and Shirataki are split off.
2005: The towns of Engaru, Ikutahara, Maruseppu, and the village of Shirataki merge to form the new town of Engaru.

Notable geography
 Mountains: Mt. Murii, ; Mt. Hirayama, ; Mt. Shiyūbetsu, ; Mt. Chitokaniushi, ; Mt. Kitami-Fuji, 
 Major rivers: Yūbetsu River; Ikutahara River; Maruseppu River; Setose River; Shanafuchi River; Murii River
 Waterfalls: Yamabiko no Taki, Rokumei no Taki, Jūsan no Taki, Shirataki
 Others: , a rocky hill made of underwater lava of andesitic (hyaloclastite) which was spewn out from an underwater volcano in the Miocene Epoch of the Neogene Period in the Cenozoic Era (about 7 million years ago) with volcanic sandstone conglomerate.

Industry
The major industries are commercial forestry, wood processing, and agriculture.

In the past, Engaru Station was the intersection of the Nayoro Main Line (closed in 1989) and the Sekihoku Main Line. It had an important position in business and overall development.

Climate
According to the Köppen climate classification, Engaru has a humid continental climate (Dfb) with warm, rainy summers and extremely snowy, long, and cold winters.

Gallery

Sister cities
 Bastos, São Paulo, Brazil
 Moirans-en-Montagne, Jura, France

Notable people
 Morihei Ueshiba (1883 - 1969) the founder of Aikido, leading Kishū Settlers Group at Shirataki area from Tanabe
 Yoshikazu Yasuhiko (born 1947) animator, manga artist, and character designer of 1979-1980 TV series Mobile Suit Gundam
 Tomonori Kogawa (born 1950) animator, and animation director of 1980 TV series Space Runaway Ideon
 Masami Tanaka (born 1979) a former swimmer

See also
 Engaru Shimbun - the regional newspaper

References

External links

Official Website 
Taiyo-no-Oka Engaru Park Official Website 

 
Towns in Hokkaido